Lake Osveya or Lake Osveyskoye ( or ;  or ) is a large freshwater lake in the Vitebsk Region, northern Belarus, near the borders with Latvia and Russia. The Republic of Belarus's most extreme northern point is situated only a few degrees further north of the lake.

References

Osveya
Verkhnyadzvinsk District